The following is an incomplete list of paintings by Artemisia Gentileschi. Catalogue numbers abbreviated "WB" are taken from the 1999 publication by Raymond Ward Bissell, and number abbreviated "MET" are from the 2001 publication by the Metropolitan Museum of Art. Other attributions are taken from Jesse Locker's The Language of Painting. Further references are available on the Bibliography on Artemisia Gentileschi.

References

Gentileschi,Artemisia